Susan Elizabeth Frazier (May 29, 1864 – February 3, 1924) was a thought leader on the issues of women's and African Americans' rights and capacity. She was an active and accomplished substitute teacher in New York City Public Schools at a time when such opportunities for African American women were very limited.

On February 16, 1892 she delivered an address to an audience of the Brooklyn Literary Union, called "Some Afro American Women of Mark" which has been referenced from its time of first presentation, through to contemporary books and dissertations today.

In 1894 Frazier applied for the position of New York City public school teacher, at a school with white students.  Later that year she received a request to meet in person with School 58 principal F. W. James.  Upon meeting her, James declined to appoint her due to her African heritage, saying such an appointment could "cause trouble."  At the time, African-Americans were restricted to teaching only other African Americans.

She is quoted as saying at the time, "There are colored teachers in the schools of Brooklyn, Jersey City, Boston and other cities, and I think it time that the color line was obliterated in appointing a teacher in New York City."

So she took her case to the courts, which initially rejected her plea in 1895.  But she was eventually appointed May 26, 1896.

During World War I she was president of the Women's Auxiliary of the Old Fifteenth National Guard, an African American troop, and continued to work with the 369th Infantry as it became known.

Frazier was among 15 New York City public school teachers who won a contest promoted in the spring of 1919 by the Evening Telegram. The contest, based on votes from the public, identified the most popular teachers and sent them to the very recently silenced battlefields of Europe. They left for Europe on November 10, 1919 on the SS Royal George, receiving a leave of absence from their teaching positions.

Upon her death in 1924, full military honors were held in the 369th Regiment Armory and her casket was draped with the American flag. She was the great-granddaughter of African American Revolutionary War Veteran Andrew Frazier.

Citations

Bibliography

External links
 Photograph of Miss Susan Elizabeth Frazier from "Homespun Heroines and Other Women of Distinction" by Hallie Q. Brown
 Application of colored woman from Brooklyn, for membership in Daughters of the American Revolution

1864 births
1924 deaths
African-American schoolteachers
Schoolteachers from New York (state)
American women educators
Educators from New York City
African Americans in World War I
20th-century African-American women
20th-century African-American people